Johnston's genet (Genetta johnstoni) is a genet species native to the Upper Guinean forests. As it is threatened by deforestation and conversion of rainforest to agriculturally and industrially used land, it is listed as Near Threatened on the IUCN Red List.

It is considered one of West Africa's least known carnivores, and until the turn of the century was known only from museum collections. In January 2000, a dead individual was found near the Taï National Park in Côte d'Ivoire. In July of the same year, the first live individual known to science was trapped.

In 2011, it was recorded for the first time in Dindefelo Nature Reserve, a protected area in southeastern Senegal.

Characteristics 
The short fur of Johnston's genet is rich golden to ochre yellowish with small reddish spots on the sides, a dark stripe along the spine and dark limbs. Its hind legs are dark grey. Its tail has eight black and seven pale rings, and a brown tip that is whitish below.

References

Johnston's genet
Mammals of West Africa
Johnston's genet